Fog City Records is an independent record label based in San Francisco. Founded in 1996 by producer/engineer Dan Prothero, the label's first release was Coolin' Off which helped the career of New Orleans-based band Galactic. This was followed by debut albums by Galactic drummer Stanton Moore, Garage A Trois, Papa Mali, Robert Walter's 20th Congress, MOFRO, Etienne de Rocher, and Tim Bluhm.

Discography
 Galactic – Coolin' Off
 Stanton Moore – All Kooked Out!
 Garage A Trois – Mysteryfunk
 Papa Mali – Thunder Chicken
 Robert Walter's 20th Congress – Money Shot
 MOFRO – Blackwater
 Robert Walter – In a Holiday Groove
 Tim Bluhm – California Way
 Etienne de Rocher – Etienne de Rocher

See also
 List of record labels

References

American independent record labels
Record labels established in 1996